Blaenavon is an English indie rock band based out of Hampshire. The band is composed of Ben Gregory (vocals, guitars), Frank Wright (bass), Scott Roach (guitars) and Harris McMillan (drums). The band formed in 2013, and released their first album, That's Your Lot in 2017. The album reached number 54 on the UK Albums Chart.

History

Formation and early beginnings
The band came together when they were 14 years old and attending their local secondary school. The band grew from being a simple pastime as the boys won their final year talent contest in 2013 - performing a cover of Muse's "Knights of Cydonia". They played their first London gig at the Camden Assembly and signed a recording deal with Transgressive Records. They released their debut EP, 'Koso' in 2013 and produced their second EP, 'Miss World' by the end of 2015.

2016–present: That's Your Lot
The band released their debut album through Transgressive in 2017. The album was made up of 12 tracks and received generally positive reviews. They worked with producer Jim Abbiss (Arctic Monkeys, Adele, Bombay Bicycle Club) to record the album. New member Scott Roach featured on the band's latest headline tour and is set to feature on the band's upcoming second album.

The band released the single Catatonic Skinbag in February 2019.

Discography

Studio albums

Extended plays

References

External links
 
 Blaenavon discography at AllMusic
 Blaenavon discography at Discogs
 Blaenavon discography at MusicBrainz

Musical groups established in 2013
2013 establishments in England
English rock music groups
Atlantic Records artists